Muqsit b. Zuhayr al-Taghlibi was a companion of Hussain ibn Ali who was killed in the Battle of Karbala. He was also a companion of Imam Ali. According to some sources, he was martyred in the first attack of Umar ibn Sa'ad's army.

Biography 
Muqsit accompanied Ali ibn Abi Talib in various battles including battles of Jamal, Siffin, and Nahrawan. He was also a member of Hasan ibn Ali military forces in Kufa.

In the Battle of Karbala 
After Hussain's caravan reached Karbala, he and his brothers, Kurdus and Qasit, joined the Hussain's army overnight.  He was killed on the Day of Ashura.

Source 

 Shaykh Abbas Qummi , Nafasul Mahmum; Relating to the heart rending tragedy of Karbala

References 

Husayn ibn Ali
Hussainiya
680 deaths
People killed at the Battle of Karbala